Joan of Valois (13 September 1409, in Blois – 19 May 1432, in Angers) was the only surviving child of Charles, Duke of Orléans, and Isabella of Valois. She held the title Duchess of Alençon when married to John II of Alençon.

Family 

Joan's mother Isabella had previously been the queen-consort of Richard II of England, a childless marriage. When Richard II died in prison, Isabella married Joan's eventual father Charles in 1406, at the ages of 16 and 11. Joan had no full siblings, and it was not until her father's third marriage that her half siblings would be born, 25 years after her death: Marie d'Orleans, Louis XII of France and Anne d'Orleans.

Marriage and death 

In 1424 at Blois, Joan married John II of Alençon, the son of John I of Alençon and Marie of Brittany, Lady of La Guerche, but they remained childless. She died in 1432, leaving him free to later marry Marie of Armagnac. Her cause of death is unknown.

Ancestry

References 

1409 births
1432 deaths
House of Valois-Orléans
House of Valois-Alençon
People from Blois
Duchesses of Alençon